Wrestling was one of the sports which was held at the 1970 Asian Games in Bangkok, Thailand between 10 and 13 December 1970. The competition included only men's freestyle events.

Medalists

Medal table

References
 Freestyle result
 The Straits Times, 14 December 1970, Page 29

External links
UWW Database

 
1970 Asian Games events
1970
Asian Games
1970 Asian Games